Aníbal Ismael Moreno (born 13 May 1999) is an Argentine professional footballer who plays as a midfielder for Racing Club.

Club career
Moreno played the last part of his youth career in Newell's Old Boys' system, signing on 20 January 2013 from Academia Duchini following stints with Barrio Nuevo and Villa Dolores. After progressing through their academy, Moreno made his bow in professional football on 25 February 2019 as the club faced San Martín at the Estadio Marcelo Bielsa; he was substituted on in place of Maxi Rodríguez during a 3–0 win.

On 15 February 2021, Moreno joined fellow league club Racing Club on a one-year loan deal with a charge of $1 million, and a purchase option that, with bonuses, could potentially reach a total of $6 million. The purchase option would turn into an obligation if Moreno had played a certain number of matches for Racing during the season, which he did, therefore as of 1 January 2022, he became a permanent Racing player. He signed a deal until the end of 2025.

International career
Moreno was selected by the Argentina U20s in 2018 to train against the seniors at the FIFA World Cup in Russia. Later that year, he played for the U20s at the L'Alcúdia Tournament in Spain; winning five caps. In 2019, Moreno received a call-up to represent Argentina at that year's South American U-20 Championship in Chile. He won eight caps and netted one goal, against Uruguay, as they placed second in the final stage; missing out to Ecuador. Fernando Batista called Moreno up for the 2019 FIFA U-20 World Cup in Poland. In the following months, Moreno was picked for the 2019 Pan American Games in Peru with the U23s.

Moreno featured in four of Argentina's five games at the Pan American Games, as they won the tournament after beating Honduras in the final.

Career statistics
.

Honours
Argentina U23
Pan American Games: 2019

References

External links

1999 births
Living people
People from Catamarca Province
Argentine footballers
Argentina youth international footballers
Argentina under-20 international footballers
Footballers at the 2019 Pan American Games
Pan American Games gold medalists for Argentina
Pan American Games medalists in football
Medalists at the 2019 Pan American Games
Association football midfielders
Argentine Primera División players
Newell's Old Boys footballers
Racing Club de Avellaneda footballers